The following is an independently list of best-selling albums in Turkey. This list can contain any types of album, including studio albums, extended plays, greatest hits, compilations, various artists, soundtracks and remixes. The figures given do not take into account the resale of used albums or illegal copies (including in some external reports).

To ensure the highest level of fact checking, sales figures are supported by reliable sources, for example: international music-related magazines such as Music & Media and Billboard, national newspapers or Turkish music organizations like Mü-Yap, an IFPI member which represents the music industry in the country. Other sales figures were provided by MESAM (from Turkish: Türkiye Musiki Eseri Sahipleri Meslek Birliği and in English: Musical Work Owners' Society of Turkey), a copyright collective music organization established in 1986. According to British ethnomusicologist Martin Stokes, the first efforts to establish official figures by MESAM took place in 1990.

Various albums sold more than 1 million in Turkey; while all records with the mark of half-million and above are by Turkish artists, few albums have gone on to sell more than a million copies since the 2000s according to Yeni Akit. Meanwhile, Mü-Yap have awarded many domestic artists with a Diamond certification since the award inauguration in 2003, signifying certified units of 300,000. Although many of these albums reached slightly higher actual sales according to their yearly reports.

Numerous acts have several entries, with İbrahim Tatlıses, Tarkan and Sezen Aksu having the highest claims with at least one release reaching 3 million units across the nation. Furthermore, Tarkan is one of the few artists with a release with more than a million copies sold in the country in both 20th and 21st centuries. Additionally, his album Aacayipsin (1994) sold two million domestic copies, including 450,000 units in its first 10 days, and further 750,000 copies in Europe—making a first-time-ever feat for a Turkish performer. Allah Allah-Hülya (1987) by İbrahim Tatlıses became one of the fastest-selling albums to reach the million mark, in a lapse of one and a half month according to Milliyet.

Best-selling albums

More than 1 million

Below 1 million (above 500,000)

Best-selling albums by international artists 

According to Pan-European music trade magazine Music & Media, Vuelve by Ricky Martin became the best-selling album by an international soloist in Turkey, with 180,000 copies sold as of June 1998. Other releases by international artists with major sales include Metallica and their self-titled album with 300,000 units, while Madonna has at least two albums with over 100,000 copies sold in Turkey (including Like a Prayer). She also set a record for a foreign album when MDNA moved 30,000 units in just 4 days for which outsold domestic artists at that time.

Foreign albums certified by Mü-Yap 
Since their certification program established in 2003, at least 8 albums by foreign artists have obtained Platinum or Gold certification from Mü-Yap, the national music certifying body founded in 2000.

See also 
 List of best-selling albums
 List of best-selling albums by country
 Music of Turkey
 Arabesque
 Turkish pop music

References

External links
Best-selling records (singles and albums) in 2005 by Mü-Yap
Best-selling records (singles and albums) in 2006 by Mü-Yap

Turkey